Nemat may refer to:

People with the name
Marina Nemat (born 1965), Russian-Iranian-Canadian author
Orzala Ashraf Nemat, Afghan scholar and civil society activist
Rameez Nemat (born 1986), Indian first-class cricketer
Hajj Nematollah (1871–1920), mystic and religious leader of the Qajar Empire
Nemat Shafik (born 1962), British-American economist
Komeil Nemat Ghasemi (born 1988), Iranian wrestler
Nemat (militant), Afghan militant and Salafist cleric

See also
Boneh-ye Hajj Nemat, a village in Bushehr Province, Iran
Nemat Sara, a village in Gilan Province, Iran
Tall-e Nemat, a village in Lorestan Province, Iran